Tennyson is a semi-rural suburb of Sydney, in New South Wales, Australia. It is located 72 kilometres north-west of the Sydney central business district in the local government area of the City of Hawkesbury.

Landmarks
Tennyson is home to Tennyson Volunteer Bush Fire Brigade, part of the NSW Rural Fire Service. The Tennyson Bush Fire Brigade shed is the only community building in Tennyson, and hence is a community meeting point for the Tennyson Water Scheme and, on occasion, parliamentary elections.

References

Towns in New South Wales
City of Hawkesbury